Petrel Cove is a small coastal indentation at the west end of Dundee Island between Welchness and Diana Reef. The cove is adjacent to the Argentine station "Petrel," established in 1951–52, from which it takes its name.

Coves of Graham Land
Landforms of the Joinville Island group